The V-80 was a 76-ton experimental submarine and the only representative of the German Type V design produced for Nazi Germany's Kriegsmarine.

The prototype was completed in 1940 in Friedrich Krupp Germaniawerft in Kiel. The four-man vessel was designed to test the Walter hydrogen peroxide-based turbine propulsion system.

The only earlier attempt to use a chemical reaction based air-independent propulsion system was in the Spanish submarine the Ictineo II. 
 
This midget submarine led to the design of the German Type XVII submarine.

Gallery

See also
 History of submarines
 List of U-boat types

Further reading

External links

World War II submarines of Germany
Midget submarines
Experimental submarines
1940 ships